Engin Can Aksoy (born 14 November 2003) is a Turkish professional footballer who plays as a left-back for Eyüpspor, on loan from Hatayspor.

Professional career
Aksoy is a youth product of Bağcilar Eğitimspor, Bağcılar İstoçspor, Bağcılar SK and Hatayspor. He made his professional debut with Hatayspor in a 4–1 Süper Lig win over Giresunspor on 22 May 2022.  In the summer of 2022, he was promoted to Hatayspor's senior team. On 23 February 2023, he joined Eyüpspor in the TFF First League after Hatayspor withdrew from the league following the 2023 Turkey–Syria earthquake.

References

External links
 
 

2003 births
Living people
People from Bakırköy
Turkish footballers
Hatayspor footballers
Eyüpspor footballers
Süper Lig players
Association football fullbacks